"Look into My Eyes" is the third single from freestyle singer George Lamond's debut album Bad of the Heart. The song was released on August 2, 1990 by Columbia Records. It was written by Philip Andreula, Dominic Marabeti and produced by Mark Liggett and Chris Barbosa.

Track listing

US CD Maxi-Single

US 12" Single

Charts

References

1990 singles
George Lamond songs
Song recordings produced by Chris Barbosa
1990 songs
Columbia Records singles